Natica rocquignyi is a species of predatory sea snail, a marine gastropod mollusk in the family Naticidae, the moon snails.

Description
The shell size varies between 14 mm and 32 mm

Distribution
This species is distributed in the equatorial zone of the Atlantic Ocean along Angola and Gabon.

References

 Bernard, P.A. (Ed.) (1984). Coquillages du Gabon [Shells of Gabon]. Pierre A. Bernard: Libreville, Gabon. 140, 75 plates pp. 
 Fernandes F. & Rolán E. 1995 The family Naticidae in Angola (West Africa). Argonauta, 7(6-12): 1-21
 Gofas, S.; Afonso, J.P.; Brandào, M. (Ed.). (S.a.). Conchas e Moluscos de Angola = Coquillages et Mollusques d'Angola. [Shells and molluscs of Angola]. Universidade Agostinho / Elf Aquitaine Angola: Angola. 140 pp

External links
 Gastropods.com : Glyphepithema fanel rocquignyi ; accessed : 18 March 2011

Naticidae
Gastropods described in 1942